Evelyn Joshua (born December 17, 1968) is a Nigerian pastor, media personality and entrepreneur. She was the wife of T.B Joshua, and succeeded him as head of the Synagogue, Church of All Nations following his death.

Early life
On December 17, 1968, Evelyn Joshua was born in Delta State. She is a native of the Okala Okpumo community in Oshimili North, Local Government area of Delta State.

Personal life
Evelyn was married to T.B. Joshua since 1990 until his death in 2021. With him she had 3 daughters; Sarah Joshua, Promise Joshua and Heart Joshua.

Becoming new leader of SCOAN
On September 11, 2021, SCOAN named Evelyn, late T.B. Joshua's wife, as its new leader.

References

Living people
1968 births
People from Delta State
Faith healers
Nigerian television evangelists
Nigerian Christian clergy
Religious tourism